Nicole D'Agostin (born 1 February 1999) is an Italian professional racing cyclist, who currently rides for UCI Women's Continental Team .

Major results

2016
 1st Giro dei Cinque Comuni - San Giorgio di Perlena (Veneto)
 1st Bolzano
 1st Bibano Cyclo-cross
 2nd San Giustino
 2nd Monza–Madonna del Ghisallo
2017
 1st Monza–Madonna del Ghisallo
 1st Assisi
 1st Stage 2 Giro della Campania
 2nd San Remo
 2nd Bolzano Cyclo-cross
 3rd Giro dei Cinque Comuni - San Giorgio di Perlena (Veneto)
 6th Memorial Franco Basso (Breganze, Vicenza, Veneto)
2018
 1st Trofeo Massetani a Corridonia
 4th Bolzano Cyclo-cross
 5th Trofeo Triveneto
 6th Memorial Franco Basso (Breganze, Vicenza, Veneto)
2019
 2nd Bizkaikoloreak Klasikoa Zaldibar
 2nd Subida a Gorla
 2nd Balmasedako Emakumeen Saria
 3rd Trofeo Bajo Andarax

References

External links
 

1999 births
Living people
Italian female cyclists
Place of birth missing (living people)
People from Conegliano
Cyclists from the Province of Treviso